16 Psyche is a large M-type asteroid discovered by the Italian astronomer Annibale de Gasparis on 17 March 1852 and named after the Greek goddess Psyche.
The prefix "16" signifies that it was the sixteenth minor planet in order of discovery.
It is the largest and most massive of the M-type asteroids, and one of the dozen most massive asteroids. Historically, it was  hypothesized to be the exposed core of a protoplanet, but numerous recent studies have all but ruled that out. Psyche will be explored by the spacecraft of the same name, humanity's first visit to a metallic asteroid. Launch is planned in 2023 and arrival in 2029.

Symbol 
Astronomers created icon-like symbols for the first fifteen asteroids to be discovered, as a type of shorthand notation consistent with older notation for the classical planets. Psyche was given an iconic symbol, as were a few other asteroids discovered after 16 Psyche. The symbol was a butterfly's wing topped by a star ( or ), as the butterfly was a Greek symbol of the soul (psyche being the Greek word for "soul").

However, the iconic symbols for all asteroids were superseded before Psyche's symbol ever came into use. With more than a dozen asteroids discovered, remembering all their individual emblems became increasingly cumbersome, and in 1851, German astronomer J.F. Encke suggested using a circled number instead: . The first asteroid designated with the new scheme was  Psyche, when American astronomer J. Ferguson published his observations in 1852.

Characteristics

Size 
This is 15% larger than the currently accepted mean value, but was later found to be an accurate estimate for the IRAS viewing aspect because Psyche was viewed pole-on at the time of the measurement.

Psyche has been observed to occult a star on nine occasions. Four of these, 2004, 2010, 2014, 2019 generated multi-chord data sets and have been used along with adaptive optics imaging and three-dimensional modeling to estimate Psyche's mean diameter, with recent models all converging to an equivalent-volume mean diameter of  km.

Mass and bulk density
Psyche is massive enough that its gravitational perturbations on other asteroids can be observed, which enables a mass measurement.

Shape and spin pole
The first published three-dimensional shape model for Psyche was derived from an analysis of numerous 
light curves. Since then, additional refinements to the shape have been made based on the inversion of lightcurves, adaptive optics observations, radar observations, thermal imaging, and occultations. The most recent models show that Psyche has a shape consistent with a Jacobi ellipsoid and dimensions within a few km of 278 km x 238 km x 171 km.

Each shape model provides an estimate of the direction of the north pole (spin axis). This means that it is essentially tilted toward the ecliptic, with an axial tilt of 98°.

Features

Numerous features have been reported on Psyche. The largest of these are regions of mass-deficits relative to its nominal ellipsoid shape and are reminiscent of the Rheasilvia basin on 4 Vesta.

In addition to the large-scale regions of mass-deficit, several apparent craters have been reported. Observers using the Very Large Telescope's adaptive optics SPHERE imager reported two large craters, on the order of 90 km across, which were provisionally named Meroe  and Panthia , after the twin witches in the Roman novel Metamorphoses by Apuleius. Observers using the Arecibo Radar Telescope reported craters at the south pole (referred to as Delta), southern midlatitudes (referred to as Eros), and the north pole (referred to as Foxtrot). An analysis of the features present in several independent shape models suggests that craters Panthia and Eros are almost certainly real and Foxtrot is likely to be real. However, there is uncertainty over the existence of Meroe and Delta. 

Early lightcurve studies suggested that Psyche has large variations in its surface brightness. These variations became more evident when attempts were made to invert lightcurves to generate shape models. The most recent shape models based on lightcurve inversions simultaneously solve for surface albedo variations, and the resulting maps show regions where local albedo differs from the mean albedo by more than 20% in either direction. Notably, the Meroe crater coincides with an area much darker than the mean, and the Panthia crater coincides with an area much brighter than the mean.

This value is consistent with a silicate (rocky) regolith enriched in metal phases. However, in at least three locations, Psyche's radar albedo is nearly twice this value, suggesting high concentrations of metal phases in these regions. One of these locations corresponds with the optically bright Panthia crater, while the other two correspond with regions that have been reported as optically bright. This apparent correlation between optical and radar albedos on Psyche has led to the hypothesis that there is a link between the process(es) that create regions of high metal content and brighter terrain.

Composition 
The bulk density of Psyche places constraints on its overall composition. If Psyche were the remnant core of an early planetesimal, it would have to have an overall porosity of 50%. Given Psyche's size, this is considered highly improbable. However, there are other metal-rich meteorite types that have been suggested as Psyche analogs, each of which have bulk densities that are similar to Psyche's, including enstatite chondrites, bencubbinites, and mesosiderites.

Several observers have reported the presence of silicate minerals on the surface of Psyche. Spectra taken in October 2016 at the NASA Infrared Telescope Facility at the Mauna Kea Observatories showed evidence (~3 μm absorption feature) of hydroxyl ions on the asteroid that may suggest the presence of hydrated silicates. Since Psyche is thought to have formed under dry conditions without the presence of water, the hydroxyl may have reached Psyche via past impacts from smaller carbonaceous asteroids.

Psyche's radar albedo varies considerably over the surface, ranging from 0.22 to 0.52, values that are two to four times as high as most main-belt asteroids. Models of radar reflection equate this range of values with regolith bulk densities of 2.6 to 4.7 . This range is consistent with most of the metal-rich meteorite classes noted above and the spectroscopic detection of silicate minerals. It is inconsistent with a pure iron-nickel regolith unless it is highly porous.

Origin
Several possible origins have been proposed for Psyche. The earliest of these was that Psyche is an exposed metallic core resulting from a collision that stripped away the crust and mantle of an originally larger differentiated parent body some 500 kilometers in diameter. Other versions of this include the idea that it was not the result of a single large collision but multiple (more than three) relatively slow sideswipe collisions with bodies of comparable or larger size. However, this idea has fallen out of recent favor as mass and density estimates are inconsistent with a remnant core.  

A second hypothesis is that Psyche was disrupted and gravitationally re-accreted into a mix of metal and silicate. In this case, it may be a candidate for the parent body of the mesosiderites, a class of stony–iron meteorites.

A third hypothesis is that Psyche may be a differentiated object (like 1 Ceres and 4 Vesta) but has experienced a type of iron volcanism, also known as ferrovolcanism, while still cooling. If true, this model predicts that metal would be highly enriched only in those regions containing (relic) volcanic centers. This view has been bolstered by recent radar observations.

Exploration 

No spacecraft has visited Psyche, but in 2014 a mission to Psyche was proposed to NASA. A team led by Lindy Elkins-Tanton, the director of the School for Earth and Space Exploration at Arizona State University, presented a concept for a robotic Psyche orbiter. This team argued that 16 Psyche would be a valuable object for study because it is the only metallic core-like body discovered so far.

The spacecraft would orbit Psyche for 20 months, studying its topography, surface features, gravity, magnetism, and other characteristics and would be based on current technology, avoiding high cost and the necessity to develop new technologies. On 30 September 2015, the Psyche orbiter mission was one of five Discovery Program semifinalist proposals.

The mission was approved by NASA on 4 January 2017 and was originally targeted to launch in October 2023, with an Earth gravity assist maneuver in 2024, a Mars flyby in 2025, and arriving at the asteroid in 2030. In May 2017, the launch date was moved up to target a more efficient trajectory, launching in 2022, with a Mars gravity assist in 2023 and arriving in 2026.

On 28 February 2020, NASA awarded SpaceX a US$117 million contract to launch the Psyche spacecraft, and two smallsat secondary missions, on a Falcon Heavy rocket. As of October 2022, the mission is scheduled to launch no earlier than October 2023, reaching the asteroid in August 2029.

See also
List of minor planets and comets visited by spacecraft
List of missions to minor planets
Asteroid mining

References

External links 
 

 

 

 

18520317
Background asteroids
Psyche
M-type asteroids (Tholen)
Minor planets to be visited by spacecraft
Psyche
X-type asteroids (SMASS)